Thailand's vehicle registration plates are issued by the Department of Land Transport (DLT) of the Ministry of Transport. They must be displayed on all motorized road vehicles (with the exception of royal-, police- and military-owned vehicles), as required by the Motor Vehicle Act, B.E. 2522 (1979 CE) and the Land Transport Act, B.E. 2522. The plates vary in design, colors and dimensions according to the type of vehicle, but usually display a registration number (usually a two-character letter or numerical prefix and a four-digit number) and the vehicle's province of registration. Specifications are given in Ministry of Transport regulations. Current style started in 1975 for most vehicle types, but with small changes in 1997, and 1997 for motorcycles.

Design
All license plates are rectangular, with variations in size and color according to the class of the vehicle. Most plates prominently display the vehicle registration ID, which usually consists of Thai letters and a number string. The province of registration is shown below the ID. The letters are embossed, and all plates must also be embossed with a seal bearing the letters "ขส". The current designs are regulated by the notification of the Department of Land Transport dated B.E. 2554 (2011 CE) for buses and trucks, and by the ministerial regulation issued B.E. 2554 for other motor vehicles.

General plates
Plates for cars, vans, pick-up trucks, motorised tricycles, trailers, road rollers, tractors and agricultural vehicles follow the same design. The registration ID consists of two series letters followed by a serial number string of up to four digits, from 1 to 9999, without leading zeroes, e.g. "กข 1" or "กข 1234". A leading digit may be added in front of the two letters if the letter pool has been exhausted, as is the case in Bangkok since 2012, giving the format "1กข 1234". Due to the case, the new plates, since 2012, have reduced text size, to keep the plate size. The province of registration is displayed in Thai underneath the registration ID, with the exception of Yala Province which cars can also register at Betong District, due to its distant proximity from Mueang Yala District where the administrative offices are located. The colors of the text and background depend on the type of vehicle, and are given in following table:

Vanity (auction) plates 

Since 2003, certain serial numbers in each series are made available for auction. These include single-digit numbers (1); twin (11), triplet (111) and quadruplet (1111) numbers, round thousands (1000); straight three-digit (123) and four-digit (1234) numbers; and pairs of two like numbers (1122, 1212, 1221). Such IDs are accompanied by vanity plates with a special background image customized for each province. The auction plates, also called Super Number (lit. meaning "beautiful number car registration plate") by the Department of Land Transport (DLT), are only in private passenger car type until 2014, when private pick-up and private van auction plates are made available.

In 2014, the highest price paid at auction for a vanity plate was set at 25,000,000 baht (about US$771,000) for a Bangkok plate "1กก 1111 กรุงเทพมหานคร". Because of its very high price, DLT allowed the buyer to design the background image. On October 10, 2020, the new record was set at 28,100,000 baht (about US$935,000) for "8กก 8888 กรุงเทพมหานคร". On December 10, 2022, the auction of 9กก group plates of Bangkok took place, and the new record was set at 45,090,000 baht (about US$1,300,000) for "9กก 9999 กรุงเทพมหานคร".
  
In 2021, the Department of Land Transport confirmed the plan to release personalized plates for private passenger car type via auction. The serial letters can be a word or a person name in the Thai script: longer than 2-3 letters in the standard plates, and vowel and tone symbols can be used. The first auction of special plates took place in Bangkok on April 7, 2022, with 84 Bangkok special plates, most of them are auspicious words and numbers, and few of them are names or nicknames with numbers.

Series letters
Series letters are specific to vehicle classes. Personal cars have series beginning with (in order of adoption) ก, ข, ฆ, ง, จ, ฉ, ช, ฌ, ญ, ฎ, ฐ, ธ, พ, ภ, ว, ศ, ษ and ส; pick-up truck licenses begin with (in alphabetical order) ฒ, ณ, ต, ถ, บ, ป, ผ, ย, ร and ล; vans' begin with น, ฬ, อ and ฮ. Car taxis have IDs beginning with ท and ม. Mini truck taxi IDs begin with ฟ. Some series beginning with ส are used for tuk-tuk taxis, and some beginning with ฌ, ณ, ฎ are used by service vehicles. Trailers, road rollers, tractors and agricultural vehicles, including rot i-taen (Thai farm trucks), have ซ as their first series letter, or ฆ for some provinces.

Each new letter pair is announced by the DLT. Each provincial registrar accordingly registers new vehicles under its latest available letter pair until all 9,999 numbers have been exhausted, then moves onto the next series letter. Letters whose appearance may be confused are skipped, and so are letter pairs which form words with bad meanings. For example, the combinations "ชน" and "ตด" are not used, as they form words meaning "crash" and "fart".

Historical designs
Although license plates have likely been used since the promulgation of the Motor Vehicle Act, Rattanakosin Era 128 (1910 CE), the earliest legislation of which details are available is from 1967. The size of license plates was specified at 11 by 39 centimeters, with white text on a black background. A two-letter abbreviation of the province name, arranged vertically, was displayed to the left, and the registration ID, consisting of either a five-digit serial number or a single series letter and a four-digit serial number, was displayed to the right, e.g., "(ก.ท.) 01234" or "(ก.ท.) ก-0123". This was changed in 1975 to black-on-white plates with a size of 15 by 30 centimeters. The series identifier for Bangkok was also changed to consist of one-digit number plus one letter, e.g., "1ก-0123". The province name was given in full under the ID, as in the current system. The serial number was displayed with leading zeros, which were dropped, along with the dash, when the current format was adopted in 1997.

Motorcycle plates

Plates for motorcycles are 17.2 by 22 centimeters, with an outline. Information is displayed in three horizontal rows. The series letters and leading number is displayed on the top row, and a serial number of up to four digits on the bottom row, e.g. "1กข 1234". The province of registration is shown on the middle row. The lettering is done in black, with a white background for private motorcycles and a yellow background for hired motorcycles.

Diplomatic vehicle plates

License plates issued to members of diplomatic missions, international organizations or United Nations specialized agencies based in Thailand are 11 by 38.7 centimeters in size, with the format "ท 01 - 1234". On the top left is a letter denoting the status of the registrant ("ท" for diplomatic agents, "พ" for members of special embassy agencies, "ก" for consular agents, and "อ" for international organizations or United Nations agencies). On the bottom left is a number code denoting the country or organization. On the right is a serial number string of up to four digits, with a separating horizontal line in the middle. Plates issued to diplomatic agents are colored black on white, those issued to honorary consuls are black on gray, and others are white on light blue.

Bus and truck plates

They show the registration number which consists of two series digits and four serial digits (with leading zeros), separated by a horizontal line. The word THAILAND is displayed in capital letters above the number. The province of registration is displayed below the number, with the "ขส" seal to the left. A numerical provincial code is shown in the top right. The text is colored black, with a yellow background for hired vehicles and a white background for private vehicles.

Legal requirements

All DLT-registered vehicles are required to mount a registration plate in an easily visible position at the front and at the rear of the vehicle, except for motorcycles, for which only rear-mounting is required. Vehicles must also display an annual tax payment decal on the windshield or another visible location, depending on the type of vehicle.

Special uses

Trade plates 

Similar to those issued in the United Kingdom, motor dealers' (trade) plates, or temporary license plates, are typically carried by unregistered vehicles or vehicles without proper documents (i.e., a road tax and insurance). While the plate is most commonly utilised by authorised vehicle dealers and local vehicle companies with approvals and permits from the DLT, they  are commonly issued to new vehicles for use during the eight weeks or so that it takes for new plates to be issued.

Trade plates carry a significant number of restrictions. Drivers with red plates must seek permission from authorities if they want to use the vehicle at night. Cars with red plates cannot be driven out of the province where the vehicle was registered at purchase. Drivers must ask for permission each time they want to travel outside the specified area. Documents must be in order, with the destination and the dates of travel. Red-plated cars are not allowed to use expressways. Drivers of cars with red plates must have all car-related documents, a proper driving licence, and ID card ready for checks at all times. Police officers are authorized to stop any car with a red plate to examine the car and the driver's documents even if no traffic offence has occurred.

Trade plates are also used by foreign vehicles without proper permits or document from their countries of origin to gain permission of entry into Thailand, when clearance is authorised by customs. In special cases, such as the transfer of show cars, trade plates may also be borrowed from the DLT.

Trade plates are made from pressed alloy, with a red background and black digits. Trade plates are one or two consonants and four digits long.

As of July 2015, DLT has a plan to stop the use of trade plate as temporary license plates, and use a quicker car registration process.

International plates

As of 2008, international plates for private cars are available from the DLT upon request, for a fee. The prefix characters are translated via code-matching into two to three alphanumeric Roman characters based on Thai alphabetical order, with 7 Character plates being assigned unique codes for every possible combination of the first 3 characters that include letters ช, ฑ, ฒ, and ญ. The country name THAILAND is displayed in capital letters below the registration number, and the numerical provincial code is shown in the bottom right. The plates are black on white. They are required for transport into Myanmar, Cambodia, southern China, Laos, Vietnam, Malaysia, and Singapore. However, they are not legal inside Thailand, and must be removed upon re-entering the country.

Here below the official Thai-Latin characters translation of Thai plates:

ก: A 
ข: B 
ค: C 
ง: D
จ: E 
ฉ: F 
ช: G
ฌ: H
ฏ: I
ฐ: J 
ณ: K
ด: L 
ฅ: M 
ถ: N
ท: O
ธ: P
น: Q
บ: R 
ป: S
ผ: T 
พ: U
ฟ: V 
ภ: W 
ม: X 
ย: Y
ร: Z
ล: 1 
ว:  2 
ศ: 3 
ษ: 4 
ส: 5
ห: 6
ฬ: 7
อ: 8
ฮ: 9
ญ: 11
ฒ :12
ฑ: 13 
ช: 14 
ญญ: V1
ฒฒ: V2 
ฑฑ: V3 
ญฒ: V4
ฒญ: V5 
ฑญ:  V6 
ฑฒ: V7 
The current international vehicle registration code for Thailand, adopted 1954, is "T".

Non-DLT plates
The DLT's authority does not cover vehicles used by the king, the Royal Thai Police, the Bureau of the Royal Household, or the Royal Thai Armed Forces. These vehicles are marked by plates governed by their respective organizations.

Vehicles owned by the Bureau of Royal Household have registration plates bearing the letters ร.ย.ล. (short for ราชยานยนต์หลวง, "royal motor vehicle") and a registration number, usually in white on a black background. Vehicles owned by the king usually bear standard registration plates but with the reserved series prefixes of "1ด" or "ดส".

Vehicles owned by the Royal Thai Police usually have registration plates bearing the police emblem followed by the registration number. The colors are white on a maroon background.

Military vehicles have registration plates bearing their registration number preceded by the emblem of their respective military branch. Combat vehicles have red-on-white plates, while non-combat vehicles' plates are white-on-black.

Notes

References 

Thailand
Road transport in Thailand
Thailand transport-related lists
 Registration plates